The following is a sortable table of all songs by Pierce the Veil:

The column Song list the song title.
The column Writer(s) lists who wrote the song.
The column Album lists the album the song is featured on.
The column Producer lists the producer of the song.
The column Year lists the year in which the song was released.
The column Length list the length/duration of the song.

Studio recordings

References
 Footnotes
Michael Jackson cover, iTunes bonus track.
iTunes bonus track.
Originally released on Japanese edition of the album, and is featured on the 2013 reissue.
iTunes bonus track.
Amazon U.S. bonus track.
Blue Öyster Cult cover.
Bruno Mars cover.

 Citations

Pierce the Veil